Svetozár Miloslav Hurban, pen name Svetozár Hurban-Vajanský (16 January 1847 – 17 August 1916 in Martin) was a Slovak poet, lawyer and nationalist newspaper editor who was twice imprisoned. Born in Hlboké, he was the son of Jozef Miloslav Hurban.

He died in Martin, Slovakia.

References

1847 births
1916 deaths
Burials at National Cemetery in Martin
Slovak male writers
Slovak poets
People from Senica District